The Zubr Cup is a tournament for professional female tennis players played on outdoor clay courts. The event is classified as a $60,000 ITF Women's World Tennis Tour tournament and has been held in Přerov, Czech Republic, since 2005. In 2021, it was upgraded to a $60,000 event.

Past finals

Singles

Doubles

External links 
 ITF search
 Official website

ITF Women's World Tennis Tour
Clay court tennis tournaments
Tennis tournaments in the Czech Republic
2005 establishments in the Czech Republic